Savannah Churchill (born Savannah Valentine Roberts, August 21, 1920 – April 19, 1974) was an American rhythm and blues singer in the 1940s and 1950s. She is best known for her number-one R&B single "I Want To Be Loved (But Only By You)."

Life and career
Born to Creole parents Emmett Roberts and Hazel Hickman in Colfax, Louisiana, her family moved to Brooklyn, New York when she was three. Growing up, Churchill played violin and sang with the choir at St. Peter Claver Catholic School in Brooklyn. She graduated from Brooklyn's Girls' High School.

In the 1930 and 1940 United States Census she and her parents are listed as Negro, as Louisiana Creoles were required to do at the time. Churchill never denied her African American ancestry even as she attained fame, and she appeared in black publications such as Jet magazine.

In 1939, Churchill quit her job as a waitress to pursue a singing career. She began singing at Small's Paradise in Harlem, earning $18 a week. She performed with the Crystal Caraverns in Washington D.C. and then toured with Edgar Hayes band in 1941.

Her first recordings, including the risqué "Fat Meat Is Good Meat", issued on Beacon Records in 1942. These were followed the next year by recordings on Capitol with the Benny Carter Orchestra, including her first hit "Hurry, Hurry".

In 1945, Churchill signed with Irving Berman's Manor Records, and that year "Daddy Daddy" peaked at #3 on the R&B chart. Two years later, reached #1 on the R&B chart with "I Want To Be Loved (But Only By You)", which topped the charts for eight weeks. The record was billed as being with vocal group The Sentimentalists, who soon renamed themselves The Four Tunes. Subsequent recordings with The Four Tunes, including "Time Out For Tears" (#10 R&B, #24 pop) and "I Want To Cry", both in 1948, were also successful.

Billed as "Sex-Sational", Churchill performed to much acclaim, and appeared in the movies Miracle in Harlem (1948) and Souls of Sin (1949). The films feature African American casts.

From 1949, Churchill recorded with Regal, RCA Victor and Decca Records, recording the original version of "Shake A Hand", later a big hit for Faye Adams, and also recording with the Ray Charles Singers.

By 1952, Churchill became one of the top box-office attraction at the Apollo Theater in Harlem, the Regal Theater in Chicago, the Howard Theater in Washington D.C., and the Palladium in London. She toured widely with backing vocal group The Striders, including a visit to Hawaii in 1954.

In 1953, Churchill released gospel tunes on Decca Records. In 1956, she was one of the first artists signed to the Argo label, set up as a subsidiary to Chess Records.

Churchill's career ended in 1956 when, as she was singing on stage in a club, a drunken man fell on top of her from a balcony above, causing severe, debilitating injuries from which she would never fully recover. Although she did some recording in 1960, releasing her debut album Time Out For Tears on Jamie Records, her health declined greatly until her death from pneumonia in Brooklyn in 1974.

Personal life
Churchill had two children with her first husband, David Churchill, who was killed in a car accident in 1941. On May 19, 1952, Churchill remarried to Jesse Johnson in Franklin, Ohio.

Discography

Chart singles

Filmography
Miracle in Harlem (1948)
Souls of Sin (1949)

References

External links
Savannah Churchill Biography I
Savannah Churchill Biography II
Savannah Churchill Biography & Discography
Savannah Churchill press clippings 1943-1953

1920 births
1974 deaths
American rhythm and blues singers
Manor Records artists
20th-century American singers
People from Colfax, Louisiana
20th-century American women singers
Capitol Records artists
Decca Records artists
RCA Victor artists
American people of Creole descent
20th-century African-American women singers
Singers from Louisiana
People from Brooklyn
Jamie Records artists